Mattesia is a genus of parasitic alveolates of the phylum Apicomplexa. Species in this genus infect insects (Coleoptera, Hymenoptera, Lepidoptera and Siphonaptera).

Taxonomy

The genus was created in 1930 by Naville.

There are eight recognised species in this genus.

The type species is Mattesia geminata.

Description

The species in this genus are spread by the orofaecal route. They infect the fat bodies of species of Coleoptera, Hymenoptera, Lepidoptera and Siphonaptera, the hypodermis of species of Hymenoptera and the Malpighian tubules of species of Lepidoptera and Siphonaptera as well as intestine of one species of Lepidoptera.

The sporozoites are elongated and measure ~. They escape from oocyst while in gut lumen when polar plugs dissolve.

Flexing by the sporozoites generates motility. This permits them to penetrate the gut wall and migrate to the body fat where they enter cells of the adipose tissue. An apical complex appears to be present in sporozoites, merozoites and gamonts.

The meronts are found in a parasitophorous vacuole where they initially undergo micronuclear merogony by budding from the surface of the meront. The resulting merozoites spread the infection in the body fat, followed by macronuclear merogony.

The macronuclear merozoites differentiate into gamonts. The micronuclei are smaller than the macronuclei by a factor of about 2-3 with the microgametes 1-2 μm in diameter and the macrogametes being 2-4 μm.

Pairs of gamonts associate as two hemispherical gametocytes with the conoidal complexes of each juxtaposed. The complexes then disappear. The host tissue has usually been lysed by the time of gametocyte formation so that the cells are extracellular among host cell debris in spaces within the lysed tissue. Several nuclear divisions involving meiosis, occur to form 4 isogametes within a gametocyst wall. This followed by pairing and copulation. Residual or somatic nuclei in 1 or 2 residual bodies later degenerate.

The two zygotes each form a delimiting wall becoming oocysts. The oocysts are usually lemon shaped with polar plugs. Four or eight sporozoites are formed internally after 2 or 3 nuclear divisions respectively.

Host records

M. alphitobii — lesser mealworm (Alphitobius diaperinus)
M. dispora — Indianmeal moth (Plodia interpunctella)
M. geminata — fire ant (Solenopsis geminata)
M. grandis — boll weevil (Anthonomus grandis)
M. orchopiae — flea (Orchopeas wickhami)
M. oryzaephili — sawtoothed grain beetle (Oryzaephilus surinamensis)
M. povolnyi — Eurasian sunflower moth (Homoeosoma nebulellum)
M. trogodermae — Glabrous cabinet beetle (Trogoderma glabrum)

Notes

This genus is a synonym of Coelogregarina Ghélélovitch, 1948.

Mattesia bombi has been moved to a new genus — Apicystis bombi.

References

Apicomplexa genera